Aspidoras fuscoguttatus is a tropical freshwater fish belonging to the Corydoradinae sub-family of the  family Callichthyidae. It originates in inland waters in South America, and is found in the upper Paraná River basin in Brazil and Peru.

In Aquariums
It feeds on worms, benthic crustaceans, insects, and plant matter. It lays eggs in dense vegetation and adults do not guard the eggs.

It is not very popular in the aquarium trade, probably because it is difficult to distinguish from other related species.

See also
List of freshwater aquarium fish species

References 

Callichthyidae
Fish of South America
Fish of Brazil
Taxa named by Han Nijssen
Taxa named by Isaäc J. H. Isbrücker
Fish described in 1976